Michael (Mik'el) (died 1329), from the House of Bagrationi, was king of the western Georgian kingdom of Imereti from 1327 to 1329.

Michael was a son of the Georgian king David VI Narin and his wife, Tamar Amanelisdze, or a Palaeologian princess. In the latter case, Michael might have been named after his Byzantine ancestor, the emperor Michael VIII Palaiologos. Michael opposed accession of his elder brother, Constantine I, on the death of their father in 1293. In a subsequent internecine war, Michael seized control of the provinces of Racha, Lechkhumi, and Argveti. The conflict continued until 1327, when Michael succeeded on the death of the childless Constantine as king of Imereti, although he had claimed the title earlier, as in the 1326 charter sanctioning a reparational payment (sasiskhlo, a Georgian equivalent of weregild) by a certain Gogitashvili to Mikeladze.

Michael sought to resubjugate to the crown the great nobles and provincial dynasts (eristavi), who had asserted greater autonomy for themselves in the reign of Constantine I. His efforts were of limited success; all he could achieve was the pledge from the eristavi to pay tribute and provide troops for a royal army.

Michael died in 1329. He was succeeded by his son, Bagrat I, who, owing to his minority, never firmly sat on the throne of Imereti and was reduced to the position of a vassal duke by the resurgent king of eastern Georgia, George V "the Brilliant", in 1330.

References

Bagrationi dynasty of the Kingdom of Imereti
Kings of Imereti
1329 deaths
Year of birth unknown
Eastern Orthodox monarchs
13th-century people from Georgia (country)
14th-century people from Georgia (country)